Enemies & Immigrants is an EP by American rock band Modwheelmood released in 2006 on Buddyhead Records.

Track listing
Things Will Change - 4:08
Going Nowhere - 4:30
Delay Lama - 4:05
As I Stand Here - 4:21
Money For Good - 3:56
Yesterday - 4:06

Modwheelmood EPs
2006 EPs